336 may refer to:

The year 336 or the year 336 BC
The number 336
The EP by AFI, 336
3:36 (Music to Sleep To), a 2016 album by Poppy